Committed may refer to:

Media
 Committed, a 1992 album by the Jamaican reggae fusion band Third World
 Committed (comic strip), an American comic strip written and drawn by Michael Fry
 Committed (vocal group), an a cappella group of six male vocalists from Huntsville, Alabama
 Committed: A Skeptic Makes Peace with Marriage, a 2010 book written by Elizabeth Gilbert

Film
 Committed, a 1984 film created by Sheila McLaughlin
 Committed (1991 film), a film starring Jennifer O'Neill
 Committed (2000 film), a film directed and written by Lisa Krueger
 Committed, a 2014 Cypriot film by Stelana Kliris
 Committed: The Toronto International Film Festival, a 2010 one-hour documentary by Morgan Spurlock

Television
 Committed (CSI episode), a 2005 episode of the TV series CSI: Crime Scene Investigation
 Committed, a 2011 television film starring Andrea Roth
 Committed (American TV series), an American television sitcom that aired on NBC
 Committed (Canadian TV series), a 2001 animated television series based on the comic strip

Other
 Committed (horse) (1980–2009), American-bred, Irish-trained Thoroughbred racehorse and broodmare

See also
 Commitment (disambiguation)